Bolopus is a genus of flat-footed flies (insects in the family Platypezidae). There is one described species, Bolopus furcatus.

References

Platypezidae
Platypezoidea genera
Monotypic Diptera genera